Pacífico is an administrative neighborhood of Madrid belonging to the district of Retiro.

Wards of Madrid
Retiro (Madrid)